Southside is the debut studio album by American R&B recording artist Lloyd. It was released on July 20, 2004, via The Inc. and Island Def Jam (see 2004 in music). The singer teamed with several of record producers such as Chink Santana, Rodney Jerkins, Irv Gotti and Jasper Cameron, among others.

The album garnered a mostly positive reception from music critics, and produced the successful top thirty Billboard Hot 100 hit, "Southside" with label-mate Ashanti and "Hey Young Girl" which failed chart or sell noticeably. Soon considered a commercial failure, it reached the top ten of U.S. Billboards Top R&B/Hip-Hop Albums chart at number three, and number eleven on the Billboard 200, selling over 67,000 copies in its first week.

 Background 
Lloyd continued to record with southern rap producers after parting ways from his group N-Toon, and going on hiatus to finish high school. The single, "Hey Young Girl" was used to be included as a demo, it landed the singer a recording contract with producer Irv Gotti. Gotti signed him to join his label The Inc. with Def Jam Records.

 Singles 
The album's lead single, "Southside", featuring label-mate Ashanti, was a success on the Billboard Hot 100 chart peaking at number twenty-four and the Billboard Hot R&B/Hip-Hop Songs peaking at number thirteen. The second single, "Hey Young Girl" only manage peak at number sixty-one on the Billboard Hot R&B/Hip-Hop Songs. 

Reception
David Jeffries of Allmusic gave the album 3 out of 5 stars and wrote "While there are no 'deep' moments on Southside, the glittery production is alive and inspired and Lloyd's cool persona never fails."

Track listing
Credits adapted from the album's liner notes.Samples'''
 "Ride Wit Me" contains samples from the Fleetwood Mac recording "Little Lies", written by Christine McVie and Eddy Quintela.
 "Hey Young Girl" contains an interpolation of "Hey Young World", written by Ricky Walters.
 "Feels So Right" contains a sample from "Brothers Gonna Work It Out", written and performed by Willie Hutch.
 "Sweet Dreams" contains an interpolation of "Mockingbird" written by Charlie Foxx and Inez Foxx.

Credits and personnel
Credits for Southside'' adapted from Allmusic.

Musicians
 Greg "Neo" Anderson - keyboards
 Lloyd Jr. Polite - backing vocals
 Irv Polie - executive producer
 Wirlie Morris - drum programming
 Shawn Smith - keyboards
 Chink Santana - guitar
 Alonzo "Novel" Stevenson - backing vocals

Production
 Vocal producer: Indiana Joan, JASPER, Lloyd
 Engineers: Won Allen, David Ashton, Teddy Alexander Bishop, Milwaukee "Protools King" Buck, Carlton Lynn, Wirlie Morris, Andrew Slade
 Mixing: Mr. Leslie Braithwaite, Alvin Speights, Brian Springer
 A&R: Chris "Gotti" Lorenzo, Patrick Reynolds, Carol Vaughn, Jr.
 Creative Director: Rick Patrick
 Mastering: Tom Coyne

Charts

Weekly charts

Year-end charts

References

Southside (album)
Def Jam Recordings albums
Lloyd (singer) albums
Albums produced by Irv Gotti
Albums produced by Rodney Jerkins
Albums produced by Chink Santana
Albums produced by Jasper Cameron